Stanoy Tabakov - a Bulgarian Sambo and MMA fighter in Heavyweight division.

During the 2010 European Sambo Championship in Minsk, Belarus he won a bronze medal in combat sambo.

During the 2010 World Sambo Championships, held in Tashkent, Uzbekistan between the 4th and 8 November, Stanoy became silver medalist in Combat Sambo event, category +100. He was defeated only by the Russian Kiril Sidelnikov, known as Baby Fedor.

On 18 December 2010, during the last for the year MMA Bulgarian MahFight XVIII event Stanoy Tabakov was defeated by Nedyalko Karadzhov in the first round, 4.01 min with TKO (punches).

References

External links
 

Living people
Bulgarian male mixed martial artists
Mixed martial artists utilizing sambo
Year of birth missing (living people)